The Soul Harmonic EP  is the second EP by the Welsh alternative rock band Clockwork Radio. Produced by the band, the album was released on 22 November 2010 on the band's own label, Poly Tune.

Track listing

Members
Clockwork Radio
Rich Williams - vocals, guitar
Dan Wiebe - percussion
Iwan Jones - vocals, guitar
Nadim Mirshak - vocals, bass
Sam Quinn - piano, synths

2010 EPs